Leonore is a usually feminine given name, a variation of Eleanor, which may refer to:

Women:
 Leonore Annenberg (1918–2009), American businesswoman, diplomat and philanthropist
 Léonore Baulac (born 1989), French ballet dancer
 Leonore Davidoff (1932–2014), American feminist historian and sociologist
Leonore Gewessler (born 1977), Austrian politician
 Leonore Harris (1879–1953), American stage and screen actress
 Leonore Herzenberg (born 1935), American immunologist, geneticist and professor
 Leonore Kirschstein (1933–2017), German soprano
 Leonore Krenzlin (born 1934), German academic
 Léonore Perrus (born 1984), French fencer
 Leonore Raisig, birthname of American big band singer Lynn Roberts (1935–2017)
 Leonore Siegele-Wenschkewitz (1944–1999), German church historian
 Leonore Tiefer, American educator, researcher, therapist and activist specializing in sexuality
 Countess Leonore of Orange-Nassau (born 2006), a member of the Dutch royal family
 Princess Leonore, Duchess of Gotland (born 2014), a member of the Swedish royal family

Men:
 Léonore d'Étampes de Valençay (1589–1651), French Bishop of Chartres and Archbishop of Reims

See also
 Leonor, Princess of Asturias (born 2005), Spanish princess
 Leonora (given name)

Feminine given names